Nefermaat II was a member of the Egyptian royal family during the 4th Dynasty and vizier of Khafre (his cousin).

Nefermaat was a son of a King's Daughter Nefertkau I and a grandson of Pharaoh Sneferu.

Nefermaat was buried in mastaba G 7060 at Giza. His tomb is part of a group of tombs including those of Nefertkau I (G 7050) and his son Sneferukhaf (G 7070). Nefermaat's tomb is located near the Pyramid of Khufu, who may not only have been his uncle, but also his father (according to George Andrew Reisner). This last point is rejected by Strudwick and Baud. He was nevertheless considered close enough family to be elevated to the vizierate, a title reserved to close family member during the 4th Dynasty.

Titles 
The full list of titles of Kawab were:

Translations and indexes from Dilwyn Jones.

See also 
 Nefermaat I

References

External link

Princes of the Fourth Dynasty of Egypt
Viziers of the Fourth Dynasty of Egypt
Khufu